Stuck may refer to:

Film and television
Stuck (2001 film), a short film directed by Jamie Babbit
Stuck (2002 film), a Canadian TV drama directed by Lindsay Bourne
Stuck (2007 film), a thriller directed by Stuart Gordon and starring Stephen Rea and Mena Suvari
Stuck!, a 2009 film by Steve Balderson
Stuck (2014 film), a 2014 romantic comedy film directed by Stuart Acher
Stuck (2017 film), a 2017 American film
Stuck (TV series), a 2022 British sitcom starring Dylan Moran and Morgana Robinson
"Stuck", an episode of Hart of Dixie

Music
Stuck (album), a 2014 album by hard rock band Adelitas Way
Stuck (EP), a 1994 EP by Puddle of Mudd
"Stuck" (Caro Emerald song), 2010
"Stuck" (Stacie Orrico song), 2003
Stuck (Lost Kings song), 2018
"Stuck", by Imagine Dragons from Origins
"Stuck", by Norah Jones from The Fall

People
Amanda Stuck (born 1982), American politician
Franz Stuck (1863–1928), German painter and sculptor
Hans Stuck (1900–1978), German-Austrian race driver
Hans-Joachim Stuck (born 1951), German-Austrian race driver
Hudson Stuck (1865–1920), American mountaineer
Jean-Baptiste Stuck (1680–1755), French-Italian composer
John Stuck (born 1943), English cricketer

Other uses
 Stuck (unit), a unit of wine

See also

STUC (disambiguation)
Stuk (disambiguation)